Zeon is a fictional place in the anime series Mobile Suit Gundam.

Zeon may also refer to:

 Zeon, a liturgical action
 Zeon Ltd, owner of the Ingersoll Watch Company
 Zeon, a character from Xenoblade Chronicles 3

See also
 Xeon, a brand of Intel microprocessors
 Zion (disambiguation)